Waterloo is a locality consisting of a collection of farms and houses approximately  north of the town of Beaufort, Victoria and  west north west of the state capital of Melbourne.

It was originally settled during the Victorian gold rush as part of the Baxter lead alluvial Gold Mining Precinct, Waterloo Post Office opening on 1 November 1860 and closing in 1965.

Following the gold rush, Waterloo became a settled defined township with stores, a primary school, hotels and a public hall.  All have now closed/disappeared leaving behind a collection of houses and farms where a bigger town once stood. There are 110 people in the area.

The locality is the birthplace of Ernest Chinnery (5 November 1887- 17 December 1972), an Australian anthropologist and public servant who worked extensively in Papua New Guinea and visited communities along the Sepik river.

During World War I many men from Waterloo served in the 57th Battalion, 2nd Reinforcement of the Australian Army.

The Waterloo Community Cup is a series of equestrian endurance rides based at the Waterloo Recreation Grounds.

References

Towns in Victoria (Australia)
Mining towns in Victoria (Australia)